Boltons is a civil parish in the Borough of Allerdale in Cumbria, England.  It contains 14 listed buildings that are recorded in the National Heritage List for England.  Of these, one is  listed at Grade I, the highest of the three grades, one is at Grade II*, the middle grade, and the others are at Grade II, the lowest grade.  The parish contains the village of Boltongate and smaller settlements, and is otherwise completely rural.  Most of the listed buildings are houses with associated structures, farmhouses and farm buildings.  The other listed buildings are a church, its former rectory, a war memorial, and four milestones provided for the Carlisle-Cockermouth Turnpike.


Key

Buildings

Notes and references

Notes

Citations

Sources

Lists of listed buildings in Cumbria